Sherman Carlos Cocroft (born August 29, 1961) is a retired American football defensive back.

High school career
Cocroft played high school football at Watsonville High School.

College career
Cocroft played college football at San José State University.  Prior to that he played at Cabrillo College.

Professional career
Cocroft played for the National Football League's Kansas City Chiefs, Buffalo Bills and Tampa Bay Buccaneers between 1989 and 1994.

1961 births
Living people
People from Watsonville, California
Sportspeople from California
American football cornerbacks
San Jose State Spartans football players
Kansas City Chiefs players
Buffalo Bills players
Tampa Bay Buccaneers players
Players of American football from California
Cabrillo Seahawks football players